Gailey may refer to:

 Gailey, Staffordshire, England
 Gailey Reservoirs
 Gailey railway station
 Gailey (surname), people with the surname Gailey
 Fred Gailey, Kris Kringle's attorney in the movie Miracle on 34th Street